Pysznica  is a village in Stalowa Wola County, Subcarpathian Voivodeship, in south-eastern Poland. It is the seat of the gmina (administrative district) called Gmina Pysznica.

The village has a population of 2,800.

Pysznica is home to the football club Olimpia Pysznica.

References

Pysznica